DBSS may refer to:
Defense blood standard system in the United States
Design, Build and Sell Scheme in Singapore